The Army Contracting Command (ACC) is a contracting services command of the United States Army.
"On October 1, 2008, the Army recognized the formal establishment of the Army Contracting Command as a major subordinate command of the U.S. Army Materiel Command. This new Army organization performs the majority of contracting work for the U.S. Army, and consists of two subordinate commands responsible for installation and expeditionary contracting, and other Army contracting elements."

There are three parts to the Army Contracting Command:  Expeditionary Contracting Command Brigades, Mission Installation Contracting Commands, and Contracting centers.

Expeditionary Contracting Command

Expeditionary Contracting Command was a major subordinate command of the U.S. Army Contracting Command headquartered at Redstone Arsenal, Alabama.  The one-star command was organized to accomplish its global operational missions through its nine Contracting Support Brigades, seventeen Contingency Contracting Battalions, sixteen Senior Contingency Contracting Teams, and ninety-two Contingency Contracting Teams. Expeditionary Contracting Command was discontinued and merged with Army Contracting Command on October 1, 2017.

Mission and Installation Contracting Command (MICC)

Headquartered at Joint Base San Antonio, Texas, the Mission and Installation Contracting Command (MICC) is a one-star command. It is made up of more than 1,500 military and civilian members assigned to three contracting support brigades, one field directorate office and 33 field offices throughout the nation and Puerto Rico that provide contracting support across the Army.

Headquarters:
 MICC headquarters, Joint Base San Antonio-Fort Sam Houston, Texas

Contracting Support Brigades, Field Directorate Office and Subordinate Activities:
 419th Contracting Support Brigade, Fort Bragg, North Carolina
 MICC-Fort Belvoir, Fort Belvoir, Virginia
 900th Contingency Contracting Battalion/MICC-Fort Bragg, Fort Bragg, North Carolina
 922nd Contingency Contracting Battalion/MICC-Fort Campbell, Fort Campbell, Kentucky
 925th Contingency Contracting Battalion/MICC-Fort Drum, Fort Drum, New York
 MICC-Fort Polk, Fort Polk, Louisiana
 904th Contingency Contracting Battalion/MICC-Fort Stewart, Fort Stewart, Georgia
 418th Contracting Support Brigade, Fort Hood, Texas
 919th Contingency Contracting Battalion/MICC-Fort Bliss, Fort Bliss, Texas
 MICC-Dugway Proving Ground, Dugway Proving Ground, Utah
 MICC-Fort Irwin, Fort Irwin, California
 901st Contingency Contracting Battalion/MICC-Fort Hood, Fort Hood, Texas
 918th Contingency Contracting Battalion/MICC-Fort Carson, Fort Carson, Colorado
 923rd Contracting Battalion/MICC-Fort Riley, Fort Riley, Kansas
 MICC-Yuma Proving Ground, Yuma, Arizona
 902nd Contingency Contracting Battalion/MICC-Joint Base Lewis-McChord, Joint Base Lewis-McChord, Washington
 412th Contracting Support Brigade, Joint Base San Antonio-Fort Sam Houston, Texas
 MICC-Joint Base San Antonio-Fort Sam Houston, Joint Base San Antonio-Fort Sam Houston, Texas
 MICC-Fort Buchanan, Fort Buchanan, Puerto Rico
 MICC-Fort Jackson, Fort Jackson, South Carolina
 MICC-Fort Knox, Fort Knox, Kentucky
 MICC-Fort McCoy, Fort McCoy, Wisconsin
 MICC-Moffett Field, Moffett Field, California
 Field Directorate Office-Fort Eustis, Joint Base Langley-Eustis, Virginia
 MICC-Carlisle Barracks, Carlisle, Pennsylvania
 MICC-Fort Benning, Fort Benning, Georgia
 MICC-Fort Eustis, Joint Base Langley-Eustis, Virginia
 MICC-Fort Gordon, Fort Gordon, Georgia
 MICC-Fort Leavenworth, Fort Leavenworth, Kansas
 MICC-Fort Lee, Fort Lee, Virginia
 MICC-Fort Leonard Wood, Fort Leonard Wood, Missouri
 MICC-Fort Rucker, Fort Rucker, Alabama
 MICC-Fort Sill, Fort Sill, Oklahoma
 MICC-Presidio of Monterey, Seaside, California
 MICC-West Point, West Point, New York

Contracting Centers
Major Contracting Center Locations:
 ACC-Aberdeen Proving Ground, Aberdeen Proving Ground, Md.
 ACC-New Jersey, Picatinny Arsenal, N.J.
 ACC-Redstone, Redstone Arsenal, Ala.
 ACC-Rock Island, Rock Island Arsenal, Ill.
 ACC-Detroit Arsenal, Detroit Arsenal, Mich.
 ACC-Orlando, Orlando Florida

List of commanders

References

External links
 
 U.S. Army Expeditionary Contracting Command Website
 406th Support Brigade at the Institute of Heraldry
 Army Contracting Command factsheet

Military units and formations established in 2008
Contracting
Military units and formations in Alabama